An azinamine is a theoretical chemical compound in which azide functional groups (–) are attached to nitrogen. The last would be a high-energy allotrope of nitrogen.

References

Hypothetical chemical compounds
Azides